Kim Sang-Duk (born January 1, 1985) is a South Korean football player, who currently plays for Persekap Pasuruan.

Career
He played since 2008 has played for Jeonbuk Hyundai Motors (formerly Chunnam Dragons, Suwon Samsung Bluewings and Seongnam Ilhwa Chunma).

References

External links
 

1985 births
Living people
South Korean footballers
South Korean expatriate footballers
Marília Atlético Clube players
Jeonnam Dragons players
Suwon Samsung Bluewings players
Seongnam FC players
Jeonbuk Hyundai Motors players
Persijap Jepara players
K League 1 players
Liga 1 (Indonesia) players
Expatriate footballers in Brazil
Expatriate footballers in Indonesia
South Korean expatriate sportspeople in Brazil
South Korean expatriate sportspeople in Indonesia
Association football midfielders